The 2016 SEABA Under-18 Championship was the qualifying tournament for Southeast Asia Basketball Association at the 2016 FIBA Asia Under-18 Championship. The tournament was the tenth edition and took place in Medan, Indonesia from 23 April to 28 April 2016. Due to the Philippines' top five finish at the 2014 FIBA Asia Under-18 Championship, the subzone was allotted another spot to be contested, totaling to three spots for SEABA in the Asian tournament.

Standings

Round-robin results
All times are in Western Indonesian Time (UTC+07:00)

Final round
Top three teams qualify to the 2016 FIBA Asia Under-18 Championship.

Third place game

Final

Final standings

Awards

References

SEABA Under-18 Championship
International basketball competitions hosted by Indonesia
2015–16 in Asian basketball
2015–16 in Philippine basketball
2015–16 in Malaysian basketball
2015–16 in Indonesian basketball
2015–16 in Singaporean basketball
2015–16 in Thai basketball
2016 in Laotian sport